International Interactive Communications Society (IICS) is a professional trade association for companies and individuals involved in interactive media. The organization traces its roots to the days of interactive laser disc production in the San Francisco Bay Area during the 1980s. Originally the society was proposed as a special interest group of the International Television Association (ITVA), now known as Media Communications Association – International (MCA-I), but the charter members decided to establish the society as an independent entity with different membership requirements for the new interactive and computer based communications. The charter members were composed of equipment vendors, independent producers, training professionals and members of Apple's IIe computer group, Sony's SMC-70 computer & interactive LaserDisc groups and Pioneer's interactive Laserdisc groups.

In its heyday the organization had hundreds of members in the San Francisco Bay Area and thousands of members worldwide with chapters in Los Angeles, Seattle, San Francisco, Dallas, Chicago, Atlanta, San Diego, Detroit (Great Lakes).

The Detroit-area group was especially active due to the extensive use of laser-discs and computer-controlled laser-discs used by the automotive industry. John Hartigan, Detroit-Area Sony Sales Representative, wanted to sell these "new-fangled" audio-video display mechanisms with special features; so he showed up with one of the first disc players in the USA at a neighborhood event (the Detroit Folklore Society) held at the home of computer-geek-genius, Dennis Sinnett. John understood the "puppy" sales concept (you leave the puppy with the unsuspecting family knowing they will bond and not be able to return the puppy) and left the disc player with the ever-curious Sinnett. 

Of course, Hartigan also spent hours demonstrating the potential benefits to local automotive executives at Ford, General Motors and Chrysler. These machines could increase sales through training and information delivered via the magic of a laserdisc. That would mean that at least one Sony laserdisc player would need to be sold to each and every dealership in North America.

And it happened. All three automotive companies determined they needed to embrace this new technology and started to incorporate interactive media in their sales, marketing, training and information strategies. Starting with the "rudimentary" Level Two (on-board computer) type of user-controlled discs in the late 1970's and early '80's and continuing with the more sophisticated computer-overlaid graphic/text programs, the automotive industry led the way in the use and development of interactive media. Early Detroit pioneers include Dennis Sinnett, Steve Hollingsworth and Sheila Edwards (Video Nova); Ray Marx, Creative Universal. Maritz. Producers Color/Technidisc (laser-disc producers) John Kuzova. Tim and Collette Spanus. Ted Villella. Carol Yavruian. Stan Williams. And many others.

References

External links
 The original website was www.iics.org but now the closest website is the San Francisco chapter http://users.rcn.com/sfiics
 MCA-I 

Communications and media organizations based in the United States
Trade associations based in the United States